Sporting Clube Lourinhanense, simply Lourinhanense, is a Portuguese football club based in Lourinhã, Lisbon. It currently plays in the Regional Championships, and holds home games at Estádio Municipal da Lourinhã, with a capacity of 2,000 seats.

The club was founded in 1926, and served for a time as the farm team of league giants Sporting Clube de Portugal.

History

In 1993 Tiago, a goalkeeper who went on to have a very large spell with Sporting Clube de Portugal, arrived at the club, and stayed for two years before returning to his alma mater. Apart from him, other players groomed at Sporting would eventually represent the club: Luís Boa Morte, Carlos Fernandes and Miguel Vargas, amongst others.

Later on, Lourinhanense signed a new protocol of cooperation, now with F.C. Alverca, receiving players like Manú, who later played for S.L. Benfica.

In the season of 2005–06, the main team played in the championship of the 1st Division of Honor, in Lisbon's Football Association. After a third place in the following year, it was declared that the side's main objective was to achieve financial sanitation.

Appearances

Tier 3: 6

League and Cup history

Current squad

Backroom staff
Néson Franco – Manager
Miguel Rodrigues – Assistant manager
João Ribeiro – Director of football
João Gonçalves – Doctor
Hélio Mateus – Masseur
Paulo Marta – Chairman

Previous staff
Luís Brás

Kit
The traditional symbols of the club are the green and white colours in a broken shield. In the white side lays a black laurel with golden fruits, with two flowers of a first quarter and the Sun, everything in golden. In the green side, a lion in golden next to the initials SCL, also in golden.

The alternative kit is all yellow.

External links
Official website 

Association football clubs established in 1926
Football clubs in Portugal
1926 establishments in Portugal